This is a list of diplomatic missions of Solomon Islands. Solomon Islands only has a very few diplomatic missions abroad.

Americas

 Havana (Embassy)

Asia

 Beijing (Embassy)

 Jakarta (Embassy)

Europe

 Brussels (Embassy)

 London (High Commission)

Oceania

 Canberra (High Commission)

 Suva (High Commission)

 Wellington (High Commission)

 Port Moresby (High Commission)

Multilateral organisations
 
Brussels (Permanent Delegation)
 
Geneva (Permanent Mission)
New York City (Permanent Mission)
 
 Paris (Permanent Delegation)

Gallery

Non-Resident Embassies and High Commissions
If name of cities is not mentioned, then the location is in Canberra

 (Jakarta)
 (Geneva)
 (Canberra)
 (Havana)
 (Havana)
 (London)
 (Geneva)
 (Kuala Lumpur)
 (Havana)
 (Jakarta)
 (Geneva)
 (Havana)
 (Havana)
 (New York City)
 (Geneva)
 (Kuala Lumpur)
 (Jakarta)

 (Kuala Lumpur)
 (Brussels)
 (New York City)
 (Geneva)
 (Geneva)

 (Kuala Lumpur)
 (Geneva)
 (London)
 (New York City)
 (New York City)
 (Geneva)
 (Wellington)
 (New York City)
 (Geneva)
 
 (Havana) 
 (Havana)
 (Geneva)
 (New York City)

 (New York City)
 (Paris)
 (Brussels)
 
 (Brussels)
 (Geneva)
 (London)
 (London)
 (Havana)
 (New York City)
 (Havana)
 (London)
 (Havana)
 (Geneva)
 (New York City)
 (Kuala Lumpur)
 (Geneva)
 (Jakarta)
 (London)
 (London)
 (London)
 (Kuala Lumpur)
 (Geneva)
 (Geneva)
 (Kuala Lumpur)
 (Havana)
 (Kuala Lumpur)

 (Suva)
 (Jakarta)

 (Kuala Lumpur)
 (Geneva)
 (Geneva)
 (Brussels)
 (Brussels)
 (Brussels)
 (London)
 (Port Moresby)

 (Jakarta)
 (Kuala Lumpur)

 (Suva)
 (London)
 (New York City)

 (Geneva)
 (Kuala Lumpur)
 (Geneva)
 (Kuala Lumpur)

 (Brussels)

 (Brussels)
 (Geneva)
 (New York City)
 (London)
 (London)
 (Wellington)
 (Jakarta)
 (London)
 (New York City)
 (New York City)
 (Jakarta)
 (Jakarta)
 (Havana)
 (Geneva)
 (Jakarta)
 (Port Moresby)
 (Port Moresby)
 (Kuala Lumpur)
 (Geneva)
 (Geneva)

 (Havana)
 (Havana)
 (Geneva)
 (Geneva)
 (Jakarta)
 (Suva)
 (Geneva)
 (Kuala Lumpur)
 (Geneva)
 (London)
 (Havana)
 (Brussels)
 (Geneva)
 (Jakarta)
 (Jakarta)
 (Havana)

 (London)
 (Kuala Lumpur)

 (Kuala Lumpur)
 (Kuala Lumpur)
 (London)
 (Port Moresby)
 (Suva)
 (Geneva)
 (Havana)
 (Suva)
 (Jakarta)
 (Kuala Lumpur)
 (Havana)

 (Honiara)
 (Havana)
 (Kuala Lumpur)
 (Jakarta)

See also
Foreign relations of Solomon Islands
List of diplomatic missions in Solomon Islands

References
 Ministry of Foreign Affairs and External Trade of Solomon Islands

Diplo
Solomon Islands
Diplomatic missions